Yu In-ho (born 16 February 1929) was a South Korean weightlifter. He competed at the 1956 Summer Olympics, the 1960 Summer Olympics and the 1964 Summer Olympics.

References

External links
 

1929 births
Possibly living people
South Korean male weightlifters
Olympic weightlifters of South Korea
Weightlifters at the 1956 Summer Olympics
Weightlifters at the 1960 Summer Olympics
Weightlifters at the 1964 Summer Olympics
Place of birth missing
Asian Games medalists in weightlifting
Weightlifters at the 1954 Asian Games
Weightlifters at the 1958 Asian Games
Weightlifters at the 1966 Asian Games
Asian Games gold medalists for South Korea
Asian Games bronze medalists for South Korea
Medalists at the 1954 Asian Games
Medalists at the 1966 Asian Games
20th-century South Korean people
21st-century South Korean people